The Yorkshire St Leger was a greyhound racing competition held annually at Doncaster Greyhound Stadium.

It was inaugurated in 2004 and in 2019 awarded £12,000 to the winner.

Past winners

Venues & Distances 
2004-2019 (Doncaster 661m)

Sponsors
2015-2016 (Pinpoint Recruitment)
2017-2019 (S.I.S)

References

Greyhound racing competitions in the United Kingdom
Sport in South Yorkshire
Recurring sporting events established in 2004